In the mathematical discipline of model theory, the Ehrenfeucht–Fraïssé game (also called back-and-forth games)
is a technique based on game semantics for determining whether two structures 
are elementarily equivalent. The main application of Ehrenfeucht–Fraïssé games is in proving the inexpressibility of certain properties in first-order logic. Indeed, Ehrenfeucht–Fraïssé games provide a complete methodology for proving inexpressibility results for first-order logic. In this role, these games are of particular importance in finite model theory and its applications in computer science (specifically computer aided verification and database theory), since Ehrenfeucht–Fraïssé games are one of the few techniques from model theory that remain valid in the context of finite models. Other widely used techniques for proving inexpressibility results, such as the compactness theorem, do not work in finite models.

Ehrenfeucht–Fraïssé-like games can also be defined for other logics, such as fixpoint logics and pebble games for finite variable logics; extensions are powerful enough to characterise definability in existential second-order logic.

Main idea 
The main idea behind the game is that we have two structures, and two players – Spoiler and Duplicator. Duplicator wants to show that the two structures are elementarily equivalent (satisfy the same first-order sentences), whereas Spoiler wants to show that they are different. The game is played in rounds. A round proceeds as follows: Spoiler chooses any element from one of the structures, and Duplicator chooses an element from the other structure. In simplified terms, the Duplicator's task is to always pick an element "similar" to the one that the Spoiler has chosen, whereas the Spoiler's task is to choose an element for which no "similar" element exists in the other structure. Duplicator wins if there exists an isomorphism between the eventual substructures chosen from the two different structures; otherwise, Spoiler wins.

The game lasts for a fixed number of steps  (which is an ordinal – usually a finite number or ).

Definition 
Suppose that we are given two structures  
and a fixed natural number n.  We can then define the Ehrenfeucht–Fraïssé 
game  to be a game between two players, Spoiler and Duplicator, 
played as follows:
Duplicator wins if these structures are the same; Spoiler wins if they are not.

For each n we define a relation  if Duplicator wins the n-move game .  These are all equivalence relations on the class of structures with the given relation symbols.  The intersection of all these relations is again an equivalence relation .

Equivalence and inexpressibility
If the set of relation symbols being considered is finite, the converse is also true.

History 

The back-and-forth method used in the Ehrenfeucht–Fraïssé game to verify elementary equivalence was given by Roland Fraïssé 
in his thesis;
it was formulated as a game by Andrzej Ehrenfeucht. The names Spoiler and Duplicator are due to Joel Spencer.

Further reading 

Chapter 1 of Poizat's model theory text contains an introduction to the Ehrenfeucht–Fraïssé game, and so do Chapters 6, 7, and 13 of Rosenstein's book on linear orders.  A simple example of the Ehrenfeucht–Fraïssé game is given in one of Ivars Peterson's MathTrek columns.

Phokion Kolaitis' slides and Neil Immerman's book chapter on Ehrenfeucht–Fraïssé games discuss applications in computer science, the methodology for proving inexpressibility results, and several simple inexpressibility proofs using this methodology.

Ehrenfeucht–Fraïssé games are the basis for the operation of derivative on modeloids. Modeloids are certain equivalence relations and the derivative provides for a generalization of standard model theory.

References

External links
 Six Lectures on Ehrenfeucht-Fraïssé games at MATH EXPLORERS' CLUB, Cornell Department of Mathematics.
Modeloids I, Miroslav Benda, Transactions of the American Mathematical Society, Vol. 250 (Jun 1979), pp. 47 – 90 (44 pages)

Model theory